Milano Porta Romana is a railway station in Milan, Italy.

Services
Milano Porta Romana is served by line S9 of the Milan suburban railway service, operated by Trenord.

See also
Railway stations in Milan
Milan suburban railway service

References

External links

Porta Romana
Milan S Lines stations
Railway stations opened in 1931
1931 establishments in Italy
Railway stations in Italy opened in the 20th century